Delta Island is an island  long, lying close southeast of Lambda Island and east of Alpha Island in the Melchior Islands, Palmer Archipelago. The name, derived from the fourth letter of the Greek alphabet, was probably given by Discovery Investigations personnel who roughly surveyed the island in 1927. The island was surveyed by Argentine expeditions in 1942, 1943 and 1948.

See also 
 Composite Antarctic Gazetteer
 Harpun Rocks
 List of Antarctic islands south of 60° S
 Scientific Committee on Antarctic Research
 Territorial claims in Antarctica

References

Islands of the Palmer Archipelago